Lundbeck Seattle Biopharmaceuticals is a pharmaceutical development company based in Bothell, Washington. Formerly known as Alder Biopharmaceuticals, it specializes in therapeutic monoclonal antibodies. 

In May 2014, Alder went public. In early 2018, the company made a public stock offering, aiming to raise . The company identifies, develops, and manufactures antibody therapeutics to alleviate human suffering in cancer, pain, cardiovascular, and autoimmune and inflammatory disease areas.

As of September 2019, the Alder Biopharmaceuticals shares have increased with 83% in price, following the company's acquisition by the Denmark-based H. Lundbeck, in a deal valued at $1.95 billion. The company subsequently changed its name to Lundbeck Seattle Biopharmaceuticals after the acquisition.

References 

American companies established in 2004
Biotechnology companies established in 2004
Pharmaceutical companies established in 2004
2004 establishments in Washington (state)
Biotechnology companies of the United States
Life sciences industry
Pharmaceutical companies of the United States
Health care companies based in Washington (state)
Companies based in Bothell, Washington
Biopharmaceutical companies
Companies listed on the Nasdaq
2014 initial public offerings